The Alphabet Killer is a 2008 thriller-horror film, loosely based on the Alphabet murders that took place in Rochester, New York between 1971 and 1973. Eliza Dushku stars alongside Cary Elwes, Michael Ironside, Bill Moseley and Timothy Hutton. The film is directed by Rob Schmidt, director of Wrong Turn, also starring Dushku, and written by Tom Malloy, who also acted in a supporting role.

Plot
Megan Paige, an investigator for the Rochester Police Department, is investigating the murder of a young girl named Carla Castillo. Her body was found in the nearby village of Churchville, New York, along with traces of white cat hair. Opposing her colleagues and boyfriend Kenneth Shine, Megan insists that the murder is the work of a serial killer. Despite Megan's considerable efforts, she fails to catch the killer. Stress and obsession over the investigation causes Megan to hallucinate the victim's image. She ultimately has a nervous breakdown after being kicked off the case and unsuccessfully tries to commit suicide.

Following two years of medical treatment and attending a support group headed by a wheelchair-using man named Richard Ledge, Megan rejoins the police department in an office job. Following a similar murder of another young girl, Wendy Walsh, whose body is found in Webster along with some white cat hair, Megan successfully lobbies to rejoin the investigation. Partnered with Steven Harper, they try to find links between the victims.

Then another girl, Melissa Maestro, is killed in Macedon. They find a number of commonalities between Wendy and Melissa but fail to connect these to the first victim. The Webster Police Department, who has jurisdiction over the latest murder but are uncooperative, receive a call from 19-year-old Elizabeth Eckers who tells them she is being held hostage in a house. Megan is convinced the suspect is not the Alphabet Killer and breaks procedure to preempt a police raid. Megan almost defuses the situation but an officer shoots the suspect through a window and kills him. Webster police declare that the Alphabet Killer is dead and announce the discovery of white cat hair in the house. Megan spirals into another nervous breakdown.

Certain that the Webster police planted the evidence in order to justify killing an innocent, Megan continues the investigation on her own. Megan discovers that all three girls attended St. Michael's Church in Rochester. Still suffering from hallucinations of the victims, Megan visits the church and tries to question the pastor but has another breakdown and is hospitalized.

Megan escapes the hospital and takes refuge in Ledge's home. There, she finds out that he used to work as the math teacher for the St. Michael's Church, which finally reveals that he is the Alphabet killer. Before she can act, he leaps from his wheelchair – having only pretended to be disabled – and attacks her. Ledge knocks her unconscious and drives to a remote spot near the Genesee River to drown her. Before Ledge can inject her with a sedative and dump her into the river, Megan breaks free and, after a struggle, shoots him in the foot with his own gun. Ledge falls into the river just past a large waterfall, though it's unclear if he is dead or not. Unsure whether Ledge is dead and confused by her surroundings, Megan is driven by the intense situation to another, longer breakdown.

Megan is again hospitalized and kept under intensive psychiatric care. The final scenes of the film show Megan wearing a patient gown, heavily sedated and strapped to a bed in a psychiatric ward. There is no one else in the room, but in her state, she envisions the spirits of the victims waiting for her to return and seek justice for them.

The final scenes of Megan are intercut with scenes of a survived Ledge altering his appearance. He is shown in church, receiving communion and exchanging glances with a potential victim. It is unclear if these scenes of Ledge are actually occurring or are part of Megan's psychosis.

A title card announces: "In 2006, police exhumed a fireman's body and posthumously cleared him as a suspect. To date, the Alphabet Killer has not been found."

Cast
 Martin Donovan as Jim Walsh
 Eliza Dushku as Megan Paige
 Cary Elwes as Kenneth Shine
 Andrew Fiscella as Len Schafer
 Timothy Hutton as Richard Ledge
 Michael Ironside as Nathan Norcoss
 Melissa Leo as Kathy Walsh
 Carl Lumbly as Dr. Ellis Parks
 Tom Malloy as Steven Harper
 Bill Moseley as Carl Tanner
 Tom Noonan as Captain Gullikson
 Bailey Garno as Carla Castillo

Production

From 1970 to 1973, three girls in and around Rochester, New York, were brutally raped and strangled, their bodies dumped in neighboring villages. Each girl's first and last names started with the same letter and matched the initial of the name of the village where their body was found. The film deviates significantly from established facts, most evident by establishing a modern-day setting.

The filmmakers chose to focus on the personal aspect of the story and its impact on the lead character instead of police procedure in the investigation. Writer Tom Malloy developed the script with the help of a homicide investigator who had worked on the original case. The writer noted that he saw the film as a cross between A Beautiful Mind and Zodiac.

Dushku was an immediate choice for the lead role. The filmmakers also deliberately chose certain actors who had earlier played the role of a killer in other films. The film was shot in and around Rochester. The climactic scene was shot near the High Falls of Genesee River.

Reception

Release
The film was screened at multiple film festivals, including the Screamfest Horror Film Festival. The film had a limited theatrical release in the United States on November 7, 2008, when it was released in 2 theaters, only in New York. As of December 14, 2008, the film's domestic earnings are $29,784 while it grossed $76,812 in the foreign markets for a worldwide total of $106,596.

Critical response

The film was panned by critics, earning a 13% rating on Rotten Tomatoes. Gary Goldstein of the Los Angeles Times commended the actors' performances but thought the end was very unsatisfactory. LA Weekly Luke Thompson said the plot was quite predictable, but he also said that the presence of multiple supporting characters keeps viewers guessing, which made the film very interesting. Jeannette Catsoulis of The New York Times praised Dushku's skills and Schmidt's choice to be "more interested in facts than in frights".

References

External links
 
 
 
 

2000s serial killer films
2008 films
2008 independent films
2008 psychological thriller films
American films based on actual events
American independent films
American serial killer films
Films set in New York (state)
Films shot in New York City
Films shot in New York (state)
2000s English-language films
2000s American films